Myadora boltoni is a bivalve mollusc of the family Myochamidae.

References
 
 

Myochamidae
Bivalves of New Zealand
Molluscs described in 1880